Streamwood High School, or SHS, is a public four-year high school located  in Streamwood, Illinois, a northwest suburb of Chicago, in the United States. It is part of Elgin Area School District U46, which also includes Bartlett High School, Larkin High School, South Elgin High School, and Elgin High School. It is also the home of the World Languages and International Studies (WLIS) Academy.

Academics
In 2017, Streamwood High School had an average composite ACT score of 20.

Student demographics
In 2017:
23.8% White
8.2% Black
57% Hispanic
7.7% Asian
0.1% Native Hawaiian/Pacific Islander
0.8% Native American
2.4% multi-racial

Athletics
Streamwood competes in the Upstate Eight Conference. Streamwood High School's mascot is the Sabre (sword).

Notable alumni
 John Garcia, Class of 1982; local reporter for ABC 7 Eyewitness News.
 Matt Ulrich, Class of 2000; retired NFL offensive lineman; member of the Super Bowl XLI champion Indianapolis Colts

References

External links
 
 

Educational institutions established in 1978
Public high schools in Cook County, Illinois
Streamwood, Illinois
1978 establishments in Illinois
Elgin Area School District U46